The following is an episode list for the USA Network series The Big Easy, based on the 1987 film of the same name. A total of 35 episodes were produced over 2 seasons airing from August 11, 1996 to October 12, 1997.

Series overview

Episodes

Season 1 (1996–97)

Season 2 (1997)

External links

Lists of American crime drama television series episodes